Aghla More is a mountain in County Donegal, Ireland with a height of 581 metres.

Geography 
The mountain is the third most southern and fourth highest of the mountain chain, called the 'Seven Sisters' by locals (Muckish, Crocknalaragagh, Aghla Beg, Ardloughnabrackbaddy, Aghla More, Mackoght (also known as 'little Errigal') and Errigal. The Seven Sisters are part of the Derryveagh Mountain range.

External links 
 Aghla More on MountainViews.ie

Mountains and hills of County Donegal